Yallapuram or Yellapuram is a village in Palakeedu mandal, Suryapet district in Telangana state, India. It is located 51 km south of the district's capital, Suryapet.

Demographics and Location
It is located 4 km from Mandal headquarters Palakeedu, 27  km from Huzurnagar and 14 km from Deccan cement Factory.
The total population of the village is about 1509 among which 55% are males.

Politics
It is a gram panchayat headed by a Sarpanch. It comes under Huzurnagar Assembly constituency which become a separate assembly constituency with the delimitation in 2009 elections. First MLA is captain N. Uttam Kumar reddy.

Economy
The village depends on the Nagarjuna-Sagar left canal, and the village economy is based on rice cultivation. 90% of the economy of the village is from rice and daily wages.

References

Villages in Suryapet district